Warwick George Roger  (21 August 1945 – 17 August 2018) was a New Zealand journalist, and the founder of Metro magazine.

He was one of New Zealand's leading journalists during the late 20th century, and his magazine "Metro" was the first of its kind in Auckland, NZ, with its campaigning journalism, long opinionated articles, publishing of long letters to the editor in full,  no matter the viewpoint, and general celebration of glitz, gossip and conspicuous consumption. It reflected the times of the 1980s and early '90s. Roger was a keen cricket fan and a marathon runner, who also wrote a gossip column called "Felicity Ferret" which could border on the cruel, and it brought him a defamation suite in 1994, costing the magazine $100,000, and heralding the ferret's demise.  He was a mentor to many journalists and bravely faced for the last decades of his life the handicaps of Parkinson's disease. 

In the 2008 Queen's Birthday Honours, Roger was appointed an Officer of the New Zealand Order of Merit, for services to journalism.

Warwick died in 2018 at the age of 72.

References

1945 births
2018 deaths
New Zealand journalists
Officers of the New Zealand Order of Merit
New Zealand editors
New Zealand magazine editors